Bodo Nitsche (24 August 1938 –  18 February 2017) was a German tennis player.

Raised in Stuttgart, Nitsche played Bundesliga tennis for TEC Waldau. He was a member of the West German Davis Cup squad and reached the third round of the 1962 U.S. National Championships, losing to the top seed Rod Laver. In 1963 he won the singles gold medal at the World University Games in Porto Alegre. 

Nitsche worked as an engineer for Mercedes Benz outside of tennis and had three children with wife Ingrid. His younger brother Detlev was a top collegiate player in the U.S. and played in the Wimbledon junior tournament.

References

External links
 
 

1938 births
2017 deaths
West German male tennis players
Universiade gold medalists for West Germany
Universiade medalists in tennis
Medalists at the 1963 Summer Universiade
Sportspeople from Stuttgart